William Maule may refer to:

Sir William Maule, successor to the baronies of Panmure and Benvie in 1254
William Maule of Panmure, successor to the baronies of Panmure and Benvie in 1348
William Maule, 1st Earl Panmure (1700–1782), Scottish soldier and politician
William Maule, 1st Baron Panmure (1771–1852), Scottish landowner and politician
William Maule (rower) (1824-1898), English clergyman and rower